Joker Poker was a late night Australian poker program on Network Ten which aired in 2005 and 2006. The 2005 edition was hosted by Adam Spencer, with the second and final edition hosted by Mike Goldman. Both were co-hosted by New Zealand poker pro Lee Nelson and Australian model Laura Weston acted as hostess. The show was produced by Australian Production Company Freehand Productions.

The show featured Australian comedians playing no-limit Texas hold'em poker. Four comedians compete in each episode on behalf of their chosen charity. It was recorded in the high rollers' room of Sydney's Star City Casino for the first season and in a studio at Fox Studios in Sydney for the second. The weekly winner donates $5,000 to charity, while the overall winner donates $25,000.

A New Zealand version also aired in 2007.

Season one
Joker Poker was the first locally produced poker program to go to air in Australia. Hosted by Adam Spencer and Lee Nelson, it featured 40 local comedians during the course of the inaugural season. It aired on Saturday nights at 10:30pm.

The first season was won by comedian Andy Lee. The final players were Andy Lee, Doctor Turf, Simon Kennedy and Jackie Loeb.

Charities
Star City Casino provided the $100,000 prize pool that was distributed by the winners of each round and the two final tables to the following charities:

The Westmead Hospital
The Heart Foundation
Prince of Wales Foundation
Canteen
The Australian Red Cross
Barnardos Australia
The Mirrabel Foundation
The Fred Hollows Foundation
The Aids Trust of Australia
Amnesty International

Season two
Joker Poker returned in 2006, with Lee Nelson being joined by Mike Goldman in place of Spencer. The second and final season consisted of 12 late night Joker Poker shows (airing on Wednesday nights at 11:15pm), Sporting Joker Poker and Lee Nelson Invitational specials, and four Celebrity Joker Poker specials (airing Tuesday nights at 9.30pm).

Contestants

Charities
Wild Turkey provided the $140,000 prize pool that was distributed by the winners of each round and the two final tables to the following charities:

Clown Doctors
Amnesty International
Matthew Talbot
Variety Club
Surf Life Saving Association
Motor Neurone Disease
Royal Children's Hospital in Melbourne - specifically the Genetics Department
Royal Children's Hospital Melbourne
Trisha & The Reach Broadridge Fund
Kids Help Line
Bonnie Babes Foundation
Challenge Kids with Cancer

New Zealand version
The New Zealand version of the show was hosted by Brooke Howard-Smith and co-hosted by Lee Nelson. The two editions of the New Zealand version of Joker Poker (consisting of 12 episodes) began screening on TV3 Sunday nights at 10:30pm from 10 February 2007. The series was repeated on C4 with great results, airing on the following Wednesday nights at 8:30pm beginning 13 February 2007.

Sponsors for the New Zealand were Pokerstars.net, Sky City Casino and Wild Turkey.

Contestants

Season one
Episode 1: Jamie Linehan, Angus MacDonald, Ali Williams, Ben Boyce
Episode 2: Craig Parker, Mark Ferguson, Che Fu, Pam Corkery
Episode 3: Tim Shadbolt, Raybon Kan, Aja Rock, Steve Devine
Episode 4: Peter Urlich, Hayley Holt, Elizabeth Gray, Monty Betham
Episode 5: John Afoa, Daniel Braid, George Pisi, Jeremy Corbett

Season two

Episode 1: Amber Peebles, Dave Gibson, Nick Dwyer, Jamie Carroll
Episode 2: Dai Henwood, Teuila Blakely, Jessie Gurunathan, Phil Bostwick
Episode 3: Mark Williams, Dallas Tamaira, Mu (Chris Faiumu), Devin Abrams
Episode 4: Anna Scarlett, Temepara George, Sione Faumuina, Joe Cotton
Episode 5: Mikey Havoc, Simon Doull, Will Wallace, Chris Belbin

Charities

NZ Breast Cancer Foundation
Kidz First Children's Hospital 	
Starship Children's Hospital
Starship Foundation	
Special Olympics NZ	
SPCA

External links
Freehand TV
Official New Zealand Site

Network 10 original programming
Australian non-fiction television series
Television shows about poker
2005 Australian television series debuts
2006 Australian television series endings
2000s Australian game shows
Television shows set in New South Wales
Television series by Freehand Productions